Mr. Nobody is a 2009 science fiction drama film written and directed by Jaco Van Dormael and starring Jared Leto, Sarah Polley, Diane Kruger, Linh Dan Pham, Rhys Ifans, Natasha Little, Toby Regbo, and Juno Temple. It tells the life story of Nemo Nobody, a 118-year-old man who is the last mortal on Earth after the human race has achieved quasi-immortality. Nemo, memory fading, tells a doctor and journalist about his three main loves and his parents' divorce and the subsequent hardships he endured. The speculative narrative frequently changes course to investigate the alternate life paths that could have resulted from his making different decisions in his life, focusing on when he is nine, fifteen, and thirty-four. The film has nonlinear narrative that incorporates the multiverse hypothesis.

The world premiere of Mr. Nobody was at the 66th Venice International Film Festival, where it received the Golden Osella and the Biografilm Lancia Award. Critical response to the film was generally positive, and it was nominated for seven Magritte Awards, winning six, including Best Film and Best Director for Van Dormael. The film was mostly funded through European financiers, and was released in Belgium on 13 January 2010. Since its original release, Mr. Nobody has become a cult film, noted for its philosophy, cinematography, personal characters, and Pierre Van Dormael's soundtrack.

Plot

In 2092, humanity has conquered mortality through the endless renewal of cells. The world watches in fascination as the 118-year-old Nemo Nobody, the last mortal on Earth, edges towards death. No record can be found of his past and his memories are confused, so Dr. Feldheim, a psychiatrist, uses hypnosis to help Nemo remember his life. Curious to know about the world before quasi-immortality, a journalist also interviews Nemo, whose recollections primarily come from three points in his life: age 9, age 15, and age 34. Nemo makes contradictory statements, describing events from his past as having unfolded in multiple different ways, and explains that, before birth, children remember everything that will happen in their lives. At the moment of conception, the Angels of Oblivion erase the children's memories, but he says the Angels forgot about him, allowing him to "remember" different possible futures for himself.

At age 9, after his parents' divorce, Nemo says he was forced to choose whether to leave with his mother or stay with his father, and he describes what happened both when he managed to catch and board his mother's train at the last second, and when he failed to do so and was left behind.

Life with his mother
Nemo moves with his mother to Montreal. When he is a rebellious teenager, a new girl, Anna, comes to his school, and he is immediately smitten. One day at the beach, Anna asks if Nemo would like to swim with her and her friends. He insults her friends and they hardly see each other again.

In an alternate timeline, Nemo admits to Anna that he cannot swim, and the two spend time together. Nemo learns that Anna is the daughter of his mother's new boyfriend, and then husband, Harry, and the stepsiblings begin an affair, pledging their lives to one another. When Harry and Nemo's mother get divorced, Anna goes to New York with her father, and the teenagers lose touch. Years later, Nemo, who still hopes to someday see Anna again, works as a pool cleaner. One day, he and Anna pass at a train station and the pair immediately recognize each other. After a passionate reunion, Anna announces she is not ready to immediately resume the relationship. She gives Nemo her number and asks him to call her in two days and meet at a lighthouse in a local park, but he loses her phone number when a sudden downpour makes her note illegible. Nemo waits at the lighthouse every day, but Anna does not come.

In one possible life, Anna and Nemo are married with children. Nemo works at a television studio narrating educational videos. One evening, while returning home, he hits a bird, loses control of his car, plummets into a lake, and drowns.

Life with his father
Nemo stays in England with his father, who later becomes disabled. As a teenager, he works in a shop and spends his free time writing a science fiction story about a journey to Mars. At a school dance, he meets Elise and falls in love. A few days later, he goes to her house and sees her with her 22-year-old boyfriend. Frustrated, Nemo speeds away on his motorcycle, has an accident, and is hospitalized in a vegetative state. Though he cannot move or speak, he can perceive the world through his senses and detects his parents' reunion at his bedside. He imagines his fingers are on the keyboard of his typewriter and continues to work on his story.

In another timeline, Nemo speaks with Elise at her house. She tells him that she is in love with her boyfriend, Stefano, even though she knows he does not love her, but Nemo does not back down. He keeps assuring her of his feelings, and Elise eventually gives in. A few years later, she and Nemo get married. In one version of this timeline, Elise dies on their wedding day in an explosion. Nemo, in a reality mirroring his sci-fi story, takes her ashes to Mars and spreads them on the planet's surface, which he had promised to do when they were teenagers. Aboard the spacecraft on the way back to Earth, he meets Anna, but, before they can say much to each other, the ship is destroyed by asteroids. In another version, as an adult, Nemo works at the same television studio as he does in the timeline where he married Anna, and one of his coworkers drowns in the lake. The coworker's widow is Anna, whom Nemo feels he has seen before. Another timeline has Nemo and Elise married with three children, but unhappy, as Elise suffers from borderline personality disorder and chronic depression. She has attacks of hysteria and, despite Nemo's attempts to save their marriage, ultimately leaves him to pursue Stefano.

Alternately, after being rejected by Elise, teenage Nemo resolves to marry the first girl who dances with him at the next school dance, who turns out to be Jean. Though they marry and have two sons and he becomes rich, Nemo grows unhappy and bored, so he puts all of his assets in Jean's name and leaves his family. Now making all of his decisions randomly via coin toss, he goes to the airport and tells a chauffeur that he is Daniel Jones, the man the chauffeur is waiting for. He is taken to a hotel, where he is murdered while taking a bath, and his body is dumped in the woods by the assassins, who question whether they have killed the right man.

As well as the many paths that Nemo's life could take or has taken, adult Nemo is also seen to repeatedly awaken in an artificial, surrealistic environment dominated by argyle patterns. Following clues that he finds scattered throughout this world, he arrives at a dilapidated house, where he finds a DVD player hooked up to a television. In a strangely interactive video, 34-year-old Nemo is told by 118-year-old Nemo that this is a universe where Nemo Nobody was never born and his consciousness is stuck in some sort of limbo. The old Nemo states that he is experiencing the story from the end and the adult Nemo must stay alive until 5:50 a.m. on 12 February 2092.

Epilogue
Before his death, old Nemo tells the journalist that neither of them exist—they are figments of the imagination of 9-year-old Nemo at the train station as he struggles to choose between his parents. This is an impossible decision, but he knows it will define his life from then on, so the young boy is trying to determine which is the correct choice by tracing various potential outcomes of each. Ultimately, he takes a third option: he leaves both parents and runs away towards an unknown future.

On his death bed, Nemo recalls a reunion with Anna at the lighthouse. The calculated time of his death arrives, and his last word, "Anna", is broadcast to the world. The universe ceases to expand and begins to contract. The flow of time having reversed, old Nemo comes back to life and begins to cackle joyously. The other dead Nemos also come back to life, and Nemo's parents get back together. 9-year-old Nemo reverse-runs to 9-year-old Anna and reverse-skips rocks with her.

Cast

 Jared Leto as Nemo Nobody (both 34- and 118-years-old). Nemo is a Latin word meaning "nobody", and it has been pointed out that "Nemo is not only the name of the main character of Jules Verne's science fiction novel Twenty Thousand Leagues Under the Sea, but also the false name that Odysseus in Homer's poem Odyssey gives to the cyclops Polyphemus, to deceive him and save his own life." Van Dormael said Leto was chosen for the part because he is "an actor who could transform himself, as much physically as vocally, rhythmically, his breathing." Leto described the role by saying: "Mr. Nobody is everyone and no one all at the same time, an illusion, the product of his own dreams. He's love, he's hope, he's fear, he's life and he's death. This is without doubt the most complex character I've ever played. It was a challenge to keep all these lives concentrated into one character for the duration of the filming without losing myself. But we had outlines and things that helped me to keep track of where we were."
 Toby Regbo as Nemo (age 15)
 Thomas Byrne as Nemo (age 9)
 Sarah Polley as Elise. Polley was the first actor to be cast in the film. She described Elise as "a young woman who carries a lot of love inside her. She yearns to be the best of mothers but just can't do it. She's frustrated because of this inability to live the way she would like to live, all of this stemming from her depression. She doesn't understand why she can't pull out of it. Over time she develops a feeling of shame and guilt towards her husband and her children."
 Clare Stone as Elise (age 15)
 Diane Kruger as Anna. Kruger described Anna as "the most complete of all the characters. She never makes any compromises, in any one of her lives. She gets married and keeps her promise until the end: she will not fall in love with anyone else." Actress Eva Green was originally reported to have been cast in the role.
 Juno Temple as Anna (age 15)
 Laura Brumagne  as Anna (age 9)
 Linh Dan Pham as Jean. Pham said that Jean "loves Nemo Nobody with a passion but he doesn't love her. Their meeting was a misunderstanding. She thought he was honest and full of love for her. But as soon as they start a family she realizes that something is missing in their relationship, that he's never really there. It also shows that lives that seem perfect on paper might not be so perfect in reality."
 Audrey Giacomini as Jean (age 15)
 Rhys Ifans as Nemo's Father. Van Dormael chose Ifans for the part after seeing his "multifaceted" performances in Notting Hill (1999) and Enduring Love (2004).
 Natasha Little as Nemo's Mother. Little was suggested for the part by the casting director in London. Van Dormael said that "her role was decisive for the film: it was necessary that the mother should destroy the childhood happiness but that one would feel the need to go with her at the same time. That's what Natasha managed to achieve."
 Allan Corduner as Dr. Feldheim
 Daniel Mays as Young Journalist
 Michael Riley as Harry, Anna's father
 Harold Manning as TV Host
 Ben Mansfield as Stefano (both 22- and 40-years-old), teenage-Elise's boyfriend

Director Jaco Van Dormael makes a cameo appearance as Brazilian Man, and Pascal Duquenne, one of the stars of Dormael's previous film The Eighth Day, also has a cameo.

Production

Writing
The idea of parallel lives had been explored in earlier films such as Run Lola Run (1998) and Sliding Doors (1998), which influenced Jaco Van Dormael's writing of Mr. Nobody. Unlike those films, however, this one has philosophical underpinnings inspired by scientific tomes on chaos theory and the butterfly effect, pigeon superstition, and the space-time continuum. Van Dormael stated: "My starting point was a 12-minute short I made in 1982 called È pericoloso sporgersi. A kid runs behind a train with two possible choices: to go with his mother or with his father. From there we follow two possible futures. I started one version based on the fact that a woman jumps or doesn't jump on a train. Then Sliding Doors by Peter Howitt came out, followed by Run Lola Run by Tom Tykwer. I had to find something else. And that's when I realised that the story I was trying to tell was not binary, that I was above all interested by the multiplicity and complexity of choices. With this screenplay I wanted to make the viewer feel the abyss that is the infinity of possibilities. Beyond this, I wanted to find a different way of telling a story. I wanted the gaze of the child on his future to meet the gaze of the old man he has become on his past. I wanted to talk about complexity through cinema, which is a simplifying medium. While reality around us is more and more complex, the information is more and more succinct, political speeches are more and more simplistic. What interests me is complexity. Not the simple answers, which are reassuring but bound to be false."

Describing the scale of the film, the director said: "My producers don't like me saying it, but it's really a big-budget experimental film about the many different lives one person can live, depending on the choices he makes. It's about the infinite possibilities facing any person. There are no good or bad choices in life. It's simply that each choice will create another life for you. What's interesting is to be alive."

While producing the film, Van Dormael took the unique step of publishing his screenplay.

Development
The film is Van Dormael's first feature since The Eighth Day in 1996. He began trying to make Mr. Nobody in 2001, but production on the project, his first English-language feature, did not start until 2007. Regarding the decision to not film in one of the languages of his native Belgium, the director said: "The story came to me in English. It's a story set over very long distances and time frames. One of the strands of the plot is about a kid who must choose between living with his mother in Canada or his father in England. There are also some incredible English-speaking actors I wanted to work with." Van Dormael began preparing for production on Mr. Nobody in February 2007, and Sarah Polley was the first actor to be cast. Jared Leto was later cast in the primary role of Nemo Nobody.

The production budget for Mr. Nobody was €33 million (US$47 million), making it the most expensive Belgian film ever made. The budget was approved before casting was done based on Van Dormael's involvement and the strength of his script. Half of the budget was provided by the film's French producer, Philippe Godeau, through his production company, Pan-Européenne, and the other half was provided by distributors Wild Bunch and Pathé. Production took place throughout 2007, lasting 120 days and traveling to Belgium, Germany, and Canada. Scenes were filmed on location in Montreal, Canada, and at Babelsberg Studios in Berlin, Germany. Van Dormael said: "I think the film needed that for these multiple lives. Each time a new style of setting is required. And each life is filmed in a different style, with a different grammar for the camera, the colours, the decor. At the same time, if all the styles have to be very contrasted, they knock together by fusing." The three lives that Nemo Nobody experiences were separated by color-coding and musical cues. Each life's design was also based on the work of British photographer Martin Parr.

Visual effects
Van Dormael hired visual effects supervisor Louis Morin, known for his work in Eternal Sunshine of the Spotless Mind (2004), to create visual effects for Mr. Nobody. All five hundred visual effects shots were produced in Quebec by local companies. Modus FX announced having delivered 121 digital visual effects shots for the film. The company was entrusted with complex sequences that could not be captured on film, some involving the digital reproduction of entire cities, villages, and other-worldly settings, and others involving complex transitions between the different worlds and multiple lives of Nemo Nobody. Their post-production contributions involved 37 digital artists and technicians across a six-month period. A long list of software (including Autodesk's Softimage and Maya, Side Effects' Houdini, and The Foundry's Nuke) and the creation of a multitude of in-house tools, programs, and techniques were required for the shots delivered.

Music

Like Jaco Van Dormael's previous films, the score for Mr. Nobody was written by his older brother, Pierre Van Dormael. For the film, Pierre worked on simple themes and out-of-sync loops, "a mixture of superficial simplicity and underlying complexity." He wrote themes that overlapped to form new ones, each theme continuing to exist while being mixed with the others. The director did not want the music to be overtly emotional, so he and Pierre chose a minimalist orchestration, more often than not just a single guitar. Jaco said: "We wanted the instrument and the player to be felt. This stance actually sums up the whole adventure: a maximalist project with a minimalist approach." Mr. Nobody was the last film Pierre worked on before his death in 2008, and his music won the Magritte Award for Best Original Score in 2012.

The soundtrack features songs by Pierre Van Dormael, Buddy Holly, Hans Zimmer, Otis Redding, Eurythmics, Pixies, Wallace Collection, Nena, Ella Fitzgerald, and The Andrew Sisters, as well as versions of "Mr. Sandman" performed by The Chordettes, The King Brothers, Emmylou Harris, and Gob, and recordings of compositions by Erik Satie and Benjamin Britten, among others.

Themes

Mr. Nobody can be seen as a tale about choice. Nemo, a nine-year-old boy, has been thrust into a position where he must make an impossible decision—to choose between his mother and father. In the seconds preceding the rest of his life, he wonders where each choice will take him. The forces of the universe working to bring about total chaos are counteracted by this boy's overactive imagination. The dilemma that causes the film's main problem (not knowing the future), once solved, makes it all the more difficult: "I don't know the future, therefore I cannot make a decision. Now that I know the future I still cannot make one." The eloquent interplay between philosophical lifestyle and what forges reality is epitomized by the way the film constantly jumps between scenes of the young boy, the adolescent, and the mature man. The film takes a four-dimensionalist view of the nature and existence of life in the universe, with each decision branching off to create an entirely separate alternate universe. Mr. Nobody raises many ontological arguments about the subjective nature of time and investigates how actions have universal consequences, and how every single choice, irrespective of its simplicity or complexity, can make, alter, or change a lifetime.

The film also makes substantial use of chaos theory, string theory, and the butterfly effect to accentuate the lack of control that humans, as individuals, possess. There are numerous scenes, at each stage of his life, where Nemo is subject to the whims of chance, often plunging into water, a place where humans lack control, as a visual symbol of the powerlessness attributed to the human condition. The theories are used to compound reality in the film, a reality in which time always moves in one direction—the smoke never goes back into the cigarette. Then, at the end, when it seems the universe is on the precipice of ultimate chaos, making use of the Big Crunch theory, time halts and begins to reverse. This brings the freedom from choice Nemo had been seeking, for, as Nemo says in the film, "as long as you don't choose, everything remains possible." The tale of Nemo Nobody reflects a life of choices, whether or not we made the correct choices, and what would happen if we could go back and change them. In the end, Mr. Nobody, at age 118, states that it doesn't matter what we choose, because each choice, once made, has just as much significance as any alternate choice would have. The film portrays a life where we are all subject to chance, the dimensions by which we construct our reality (height, length, width, and time), and the imagination of our former selves, and, once the boy Nemo knows the outcome of a given choice, he instinctively opts for another.

The different colors used in the film have symbolic meanings. Each of the three main storylines has its own unique hue that highlights its originality and unlikeness to the others. The color differentiation can be traced as far back as Nemo's childhood, where his possible future wives, Jean, Elise, and Anna, sit on a bench, wearing yellow, blue, and red dresses, respectively. In his life with Jean, Nemo seeks material well-being and independence, and yellow—the color of life and wealth—emphasizes this. Choosing Elise, Nemo experiences the consequences of depression and despair, which are themes associated with the color blue. Finally, the true love and passionate relationship between Nemo and Anna is symbolized by the red color of Anna's dress. It is also noteworthy that the unborn Nemo is shown living in a white world, as white contains all colors of the visible spectrum, which supports the allegorical message of the film that all things are possible until a choice is made. At the end of his life, Nemo is a decrepit old man and lives in a white surrounding (room, clothes, doctor), indicating that the fate of the protagonist leads him back to his origins—the point at which everything is possible.

The idea of a child learning about their whole life in the womb only to have an angel take the memory away is a reference to the Jewish concept of Lailah, the Angel of Conception, and it also bears a resemblance to the Myth of Er as found in the Republic.

Release

Theatrical run

A longer, work-in-progress version of the film was not accepted for competition at the Cannes Film Festival. This cut was offered an out-of-competition berth, but producer Philippe Godeau rejected that offer. The decision by the Cannes Film Festival to not exhibit the film created a national controversy. Ultimately, the film's world premiere occurred at the 66th Venice International Film Festival on 12 September 2009. Six days later, Mr. Nobody screened as a special presentation during the 2009 Toronto International Film Festival. The film was also screened at the Sitges Film Festival and the Stockholm International Film Festival before its theatrical release.

Mr. Nobody opened in 36 theaters in Belgium on 13 January 2010 and grossed USD $227,917 its opening weekend, placing fourth at the Belgian box office and posting a per-theater average of $6,331. Its second weekend, the film dropped 21.9% in revenue, earning $178,098. It went on to gross nearly $1 million in the country, becoming one of the ten highest-grossing films of 2010 in Belgium.

The film was released in 150 theaters in France on the same day it premiered in Belgium. It had a disappointing opening weekend in the country due to the mixed response from French critics, and finished in eighth place at the French box office, earning $640,517. After its second weekend of release, it was at the bottom of the top ten and had grossed a cumulative $1,051,211 in France.

The American premiere of the film occurred at the Los Angeles Film Festival on 25 June 2011, nearly two years after its first screening. The Consul General of Belgium, Geert Criel, held a second showing of the film in the United States on 21 December 2011 at the Aero Theatre in Santa Monica. Magnolia Pictures released the film in select theaters in the United States on 1 November 2013.

Home media
The film' was released on DVD and Blu-ray Disc in France by Pathé on 21 July 2010. There were two versions of this release: a standard edition that included a making-of documentary, a trailer, and a photo gallery as special features, and a special edition that included the director's cut of the film, which has 1 re-cut, 23 extended, and 12 additional scenes integrated into the film and runs about 16 minutes longer than the theatrical cut.

The Warner Home Video Dutch release of the film includes a making-of documentary, deleted scenes, and a photo gallery as special features.

On 11 January 2011, the film was released in Canada on DVD and Blu-ray through Entertainment One. This release includes a making-of documentary deleted scenes as special features.

Optimum Home Entertainment released Mr. Nobody on DVD and Blu-ray in the United Kingdom on 12 September 2011 with a making-of documentary and a trailer as special features.

Reception
 

Upon its premiere at the 66th Venice International Film Festival, Mr. Nobody was positively received with a ten-minute standing ovation from the audience. On the review aggregator website Rotten Tomatoes, the film garnered a 68% approval rating from 31 critics and a weighted average rating of 6.58/10; the site's consensus reads: "Mr. Nobodys narrative tangles may bedevil as much as they entertain, but its big ambitions and absorbing visuals make for an intriguing addition to director Jaco Van Dormael's filmography." At Metacritic, which assigns a normalized rating out of 100 to reviews from mainstream critics, the film received a score of 63, based on 10 critics, indicating "generally favorable reviews".

Jennie Punter of The Globe and Mail praised the film, stating: "Van Dormael holds this fractured fairy tale together by giving it an emotional core and delivers two hours of time travel with a playful spirit and at a mostly hyperkinetic pace, sprinkling it with amusing side journeys and sometimes letting a scene unfold at a more natural tempo." Bruce Kirkland of Jam! gave the film four stars out of five and wrote: "Expect the unexpected. Try to answer the unanswerable question that writer-director Van Dormael poses. It is a worthwhile exercise." He also described Leto's acting as a "marvelously full-blooded, brain-spinning, tour-de-force performance." Ken Eisner from The Georgia Straight summarized the film as "a dazzling feat of philosophical fancy, and it attempts nothing less than the summing up of an entire life, and an epoch or two, with its free-spinning take on recent human history as projected into possible futures."

Niels Matthijs, writing for Twitch Film, stated that "It's astounding how van Dormael turns each scene into a unique little cinematic event. There is hardly filler here, no scenes to drag out the running time or to fill some gaps in between other climaxes. Every scene matters and every scene is made to look like it matters. The director uses all means to his disposal to keep the viewer engaged and interested in the life of the main protagonist, Nemo Nobody." Fred Topel, writing for Screen Junkies, praised the film's artistry, saying: "All of Nemo's lives are painful. No matter what he chooses, he experiences heartbreak, death of loved ones, his own death, and clinical depression. My future seems brighter, but the film makes the strong point that every experience is worthwhile. The goal isn't to choose the easiest path. It's to live." Chris Holt from Starburst magazine wrote that "Mr. Nobody is a film that is remarkable by its very existence and that in itself is something to be happy about. You may love it you may hate it, but you can bet that you will never forget it." Exclaim!'s Robert Bell called the film "a powerful movie about what it means to be alive."

Boyd van Hoeij of Variety magazine was more critical, writing: "Though a lot of it is well written and directed and, quite often, funny or poignant, the individual scenes rarely become part of a larger whole." He praised Leto's acting, stating that "The closest the film comes to having a gravitational center are in the scenes set in 2092. What makes them soar is not the imaginative staging of the future, but Leto's performance. His acting talent really comes into full view in his scenes as the last dying man on Earth." He also praised Regbo and Temple, saying that "Regbo, as the teenage Nemo, and Juno Temple, as the teenage Anna, are impressive, bringing the hormonal battles of adolescence vividly to life." Film critic Eric Lavallée listed Regbo as one of his "Top 10 New Faces & Voices" of the 2009 Toronto International Film Festival, noting that "newbie Toby Regbo might easily be Mr. Nobody's most 'alive' character. Playing Nemo at age 16, the actor is mostly paired with Juno Temple – their unique love story is the film's heart pumping portions and plays a lot better than the artery clogging other brushes of romance."

AlloCiné, a French cinema website, gave the film an average of three out of five stars, based on a survey of 24 reviews. Xavier Leherpeur from Le Nouvel Observateur described it as "a fiction of sterile ramifications, weighed down by a script the labyrinthine constructions of which poorly conceal the poverty of inspiration". Pierre Fornerod from Ouest-France wrote that "Van Dormael plays with chance and coincidence. The demonstration is long and heavy, but aesthetically, is superb."

Accolades

The film and its cast and crew won and were nominated for multiple awards from numerous film festivals and organizations. At the 66th Venice International Film Festival, Sylvie Olivé was awarded the Golden Osella for Outstanding Technical Contribution, and the film received the Biografilm Lancia Award; the film was also nominated for the Golden Lion, which it lost to Lebanon, and Jared Leto was nominated for the Volpi Cup for Best Actor. Christophe Beaucarne received the award for Best Cinematography at the 20th Stockholm International Film Festival, and Kaatje Van Damme won the award for Best Makeup at the 42nd Sitges Film Festival.

At the 1st Magritte Awards, the film was nominated for seven awards and was awarded six: Best Film, Best Director and Best Screenplay for Jaco Van Dormael, Best Cinematography for Christophe Beaucarne, Best Original Score for Pierre Van Dormael, and Best Editing for Matyas Veress; Emmanuel de Boissieu, Frédéric Demolder, and Dominique Warnier lost the award for Best Sound to A Town Called Panic. In addition, the film was awarded the André Cavens Award by the Belgian Film Critics Association as the best film of 2010, and won Best Film at the 2010 Fonske Awards. It also received the People's Choice Award for Best European Film at the 23rd European Film Awards, and won the Audience Award at the Biografilm Festival.

Mr. Nobody appeared on many critics' top ten lists of the greatest films of 2010. Kurt Halfyard, a film critic for Twitch Film, listed the film among the best science fiction films of the 21st century. The American Film Institute listed Mr. Nobody as one of the best European films of 2010.

References

Further reading

External links

 
 
 
 
  (rating 3.5/5)
 Mr. Nobody at Magnolia Pictures

2000s science fiction drama films
2009 films
Alternate timeline films
Belgian avant-garde and experimental films
Belgian science fiction drama films
Borderline personality disorder in fiction
Canadian avant-garde and experimental films
Canadian science fiction drama films
English-language Canadian films
Films about altered memories
Films about immortality
Films directed by Jaco Van Dormael
Films set in Montreal
Films set in England
Films set in the 2090s
Films shot in Brussels
Films shot in Berlin
Films shot in England
Films shot in Montreal
Films shot in Ottawa
French avant-garde and experimental films
French science fiction drama films
German avant-garde and experimental films
German science fiction drama films
Magritte Award winners
Mars in film
French nonlinear narrative films
Pan-Européenne films
France 2 Cinéma films
France 3 Cinéma films
Canal+ films
Films about time travel
Media containing Gymnopedies
European Film Awards winners (films)
English-language Belgian films
English-language French films
English-language German films
2000s avant-garde and experimental films
2009 drama films
2000s English-language films
2000s Canadian films
2000s French films
2000s German films